Meretz Youth (Hebrew: נוער מרצ, Noar Meretz) is the youth wing of the Israeli political party Meretz. The organization was founded in 1992, after the union between the Israeli political parties Mapam and Ratz. The first coordinator of Meretz Youth was Ilan Gilon.

Meretz Youth opened branches in Tel Aviv, Ramat Gan, Petah Tikva, Ashdod, Kiryat Ono, Beersheba, Kfar Saba, Hertzliyah, Haifa, Givatayim, Rishon LeZion, Bat Yam, Pardes Hana and Jerusalem. In their branches, the organization combines cultural and political education with political activism.

The organization is presented also in Meretz's management. In the party's constitution, it was told that 2% of the management of the party must come from Meretz Youth.

Today, about 400 students between the ages 12–18 are members of Meretz Youth.

Youth leading Youth 
According to the organization, Meretz Youth is going with the idea of "Youth leading Youth", which means that the organization is led by their own youth members, and they are the ones who decide about their activities and campaigns.

Meretz Youth's Management 
The chairperson currently is Nina Banai Shahaf.

The chairman is deciding about the at Branches of activities and campaigns together with the organization's leadership. The chairman of Meretz Youth is elected once for a year, while the leadership is elected once for half a year.

External links 
 Meretz Youth on the website of Meretz 

Youth wings of political parties in Israel
Youth wings of social democratic parties
Meretz